Zabrus vignai is a species of ground beetle in the Pelor subgenus that is endemic to Algeria.

References

Beetles described in 1990
Beetles of North Africa
Endemic fauna of Algeria
Zabrus